Creobroter  is a genus of flower mantises in the tribe Hymenopodini; species are concentrated in Asia. The name comes from the Greek kreo-, meaning "flesh") and broter" meaning "eating", therefore, "flesh-eating", an apt name for a predatory insect. Both sexes have long wings and are capable fliers.  Full-grown males are about 3 to 4 cm in length; females are about 4 to 5 cm.

Camouflage and mimicry

As the common name indicates, Creobroter spp. are known for having varicolored (yellow, white, red, brown, etc.) markings, which serve as camouflage by hiding the creatures' actual shape and making them look somewhat like flowers when hiding amidst green foliage.

The resemblance to flowers may be greater in subadults of Creobroter than adults.  This flower mimicry is only partial, but is attractive enough to make Creobroter species favored as pets, especially as they  are more common and less delicate than the more flower-like Hymenopus.

In some species (such as C. gemmatus), these markings also serve as eyespots when the mantis spreads its wings in a deimatic display.

Rather than resembling foliage or flowers, some species of Creobroter resemble ants during their early nymph stages.  Ant mimicry is a useful defense against predation for the young, as most ants are relatively unpalatable and aggressive, making insect predators that rely on vision to identify their prey, such as birds and wasps, avoid them.

Around their third ecdysis, Creobroter spp. trade their ant-mimicking, dark, shiny appearance for the green and light-colored markings that make their outline so difficult to discern amidst vegetation.

Species
No consistency is seen for the use of English common names for these species.  For example, at least two Creobroter species found in India have been called "Indian flower mantis".  Conversely, a Creobroter sp. collected in Thailand might be displayed in a collection as a "Thai flower mantis", while the same species collected elsewhere might be called a "Malaysian flower mantis".  The following species of Creobroter are described (subject to review):
 Creobroter apicalis Saussure, 1869 (synonym Creobroter elongatus (Beier, 1929))
 Creobroter celebensis Werner, 1931
 Creobroter discifera Serville, 1839 - type species
 Creobroter episcopalis Stal, 1877
 Creobroter fasciatus Werner, 1927
 Creobroter fuscoareatus Saussure, 1870
 Creobroter gemmatus Saussure, 1869
 Creobroter granulicollis Saussure, 1870
 Creobroter insolitus Beier, 1942
 Creobroter jiangxiensis Zheng, 1988
 Creobroter labuanae Hebard, 1920
 Creobroter laevicollis Saussure, 1870
 Creobroter medanus Giglio-Tos, 1915
 Creobroter meleagris Stal, 1877
 Creobroter nebulosa Zheng, 1988
 Creobroter pictipennis Wood-Mason, 1878
 Creobroter signifer Walker, 1859
 Creobroter sumatranus de Haan, 1842
 Creobroter urbanus Fabricius, 1775
 Creobroter vitripennis Beier, 1933

See also
 List of mantis genera and species

References

Further reading
 For a technical discussion of an aspect of this genus' anatomy, refer to The cervical sclerites of Mantodea discussed in the context of dictypoteran phylogency by Frank Wieland, Entomologische Abhandlungen 63, Museum fur Dresden, 2006

External links
 MantisOnline.eu: Creobroter

 
Mantodea of Asia
Fauna of Western Asia
Hymenopodidae
Mantodea genera
Taxa named by John O. Westwood